Myroslav Prodan (born 8 October 1979) – is a Ukrainian civil servant, acting head of the State Fiscal Service of Ukraine, first-rank tax and customs advisor.

Education 

Rivne Institute of Slavonic Science of Kyiv Slavonic University, specialty: management of organizations, qualification: manager in customs affairs (2003);

Odesa Regional Institute for Public Administration of the National Academy for Public Administration under the President of Ukraine, specialty: public administration, qualification: Master of Public Administration (2013);

State Fiscal Service University, specialty: enterprise economics, qualification: specialist (2016).

Career 

From June 2002 – worked in management positions in commercial structures.

From March 2005 – started working in the tax authorities of Vinnytsia region.

From September 2008 – held senior positions in the tax authorities of Vinnytsia region, Vinnitsa, Cherkasy region and the Interregional Main Directorate of the State Fiscal Service – the Central Office for Large Payers.

From July 2016 – acting Deputy Head of the State Fiscal Service of Ukraine.

From March 2017 to September 2018 – acting Head of the State Fiscal Service of Ukraine.

On 1 April 2017, Myroslav Prodan introduced an electronic register of VAT refund, establishing transparent rules for administering the tax. The process of VAT administration and control over the formation of tax liabilities and the payment of this tax were fully automated.

In 2018, all services for individual payers were transferred into an online mode: from verifications to obtaining certificates.

From 1 February 2018, Prodan fully transferred the customs paperwork to be processed according to the "one contact" principle. An exchange of information was introduced between the customs and other structures carrying out veterinary, sanitary and epidemiological, phytosanitary, environmental and radiological control.

Initiated the e-Receipt project development. Instead of the traditional payment transactions recorders, entrepreneurs were encouraged to use mobile phones, tablets, laptops and other modern communication devices. The project provides on-line registration of devices that are alternative to cash registers. Myroslav Prodan stated that it would simplify the accounting, make it more convenient, solve the problem of additional costs for operation and maintenance of cash registers.

For the first time in history, the Intra-European Organisation of Tax Administrations (IOTA) held its 21st Administrative Session of the IOTA General Assembly in Ukraine, in Kyiv, 28–30 June 2017. Delegations from 45 countries took part in the session. Under the chairmanship of Miroslav Prodan at IOTA, a new 2018–2022 IOTA Strategy was developed and an updated draft Memorandum of Understanding between IOTA and the Organization for Economic Cooperation and Development (OECD) aimed at enhancing partnerships between the two organizations, in particular in the area of professional activity related to the implementation of the BEPS Plan, was agreed.

Headed SFS delegations during his first official visit to the US at the invitation of the US Customs and Border Protection in July 2017; during the working visit to the Republic of Poland at the invitation of the National Revenue Administration of Poland in October 2017, during the reconnaissance visit to the Republic of Finland at the invitation of the Customs of Finland in November 2017, during the visit to Belgium at the invitation of the European Anti-Fraud Office (OLAF) and to participate in the 131st session of the Customs Cooperation Council of the World Customs Organization (WCO) in December 2017, during the visit to Austria at the invitation of the Container Control Programme (CCP) in March 2018.

On 16 January 2018, he signed a memorandum with Jean-Luc Lemahieu, Director of the Division for Policy Analysis and Public Affairs of the United Nations Office on Drugs and Crime, on Ukraine's involvement in the United Nations Container Control Program and the World Customs Organization. The SFS and the State Border Service gained access to international databases to track illegal flows of drugs, weapons and counterfeit.

In July 2018, with the help of Prozorro system, he procured the first ten stationary scanning systems for checkpoints, which made possible to receive full cargo information that would prevent smuggling.

In September 2018, he took discharge of his own free will, to avoid a conflict of interest, as he planned to take part in a competition to fill the vacancy of the head of the department.

Awards and honours 

 The prize weapon: a Glock 19 pistol

Corruption scandal 

At the end of August 2018, Prosecutor General Yuriy Lutsenko submitted to the Specialized Anti-Corruption Prosecutor's Office (SAPO) some of the criminal proceedings concerning Myroslav Prodan, which involved two episodes – the acquisition and construction of real estate through figureheads in Ukraine and Turkey. Lutsenko also accused Prodan of "numerous cases of smuggling committed by his subordinates". In response, Myroslav Prodan blamed Prosecutor General Yuriy Lutsenko and the department he headed for pressuring the SFS to control smuggling flows. According to him, it refers in particular to illegal export of forests and shadow schemes at Odesa customs.

Myroslav Prodan was summoned to the SAPO on 15 November 2018, but he stated that he had left for treatment in Germany 8 days before that date. He also stated that the summon was backdated and sent after he had left. Prodan claimed that he had addressed the SAPO and the GPO with a proposal to come and give an explanation for more than 4 months, but never received an answer.

Editor-in-chief of Censor.Net website Yurii Butusov attributes the matter to the fact that on 21 June 2018, the Prime Minister of Ukraine Volodymyr Hroisman, who, according to Butusov, is Prodan's patron, made a decision to let the National Police of Ukraine units enter the customs zones for fighting smuggling, which used to be the exclusive competence of the Main Department for Combating Corruption and Organized Crime of the SSU. Thus, he played against President Petro Poroshenko in favour of the Minister of Internal Affairs Arsen Avakov.

On 15 November 2018, the Specialized Anti-Corruption Prosecutor's Office reported the suspicion of the former acting Head of the State Fiscal Service (SFS) of Ukraine Myroslav Prodan of illegal enrichment for 89 million hryvnias in absentia. But during the trial, the prosecutor's office was unable to prove the guilt of the former official.

On 28 February 2019, Prodan's lawyer reported that the examination had established the fact of the case being fabricated, and the State Bureau of Investigation (DBR) opened criminal proceedings against the prosecutors of the Specialized Anti-Corruption Prosecutor's Office (SAPO), who had been engaged in the case against Prodan. The lawyer said that the investigation did not bring a single evidence that the ex-head of the SFS or his family members are related to the real estate mentioned in the case.

On 12 March 2019, NABU announced the termination of the case against Prodan.

The head of the analytical centre "Third Sector", political expert Andrii Zolotariov announced the designer nature of the case.

References

External links 
 Myroslav Prodan: We see a steady rise in customs revenue
 SFS and International Organization for Migration reinforce cooperation in the field of border management
 Acting Chairman, State Fiscal Service of Ukraine
 Acting Head of State Fiscal Service of Ukraine Myroslav Prodan Met with Head of State Administration of Taxation of China Commissioner Wang Jun
 In the SFS announced the transfer of all services to the electronic cabinet
 Myroslav Prodan: Ukraine, Moldova and Italy to enhance cooperation in law enforcement

1979 births
Ukrainian civil servants
People from Mohyliv-Podilskyi
Living people